Samuel Ross (13 November 1914 – 29 October 1973) was a Scottish footballer who played as a wing half. Ross began his career in the mid-1930s with Kilmarnock, making over 150 league appearances and picking up a Scottish Cup runners-up medal during his six years at Rugby Park. At the end of the decade, Ross joined Rangers, leaving within a year to join Falkirk. Around 1942, Ross was registered with Motherwell, joining Dundee United in 1946, where he featured in 29 league games. After leaving Tannadice, Ross moved to Greenock Morton, which was his final senior club.

Ross died in 1973.

References

External links
 

1914 births
Footballers from East Ayrshire
1973 deaths
Scottish footballers
Scottish Football League players
Kilmarnock F.C. players
Rangers F.C. players
Falkirk F.C. players
Motherwell F.C. players
Dundee United F.C. players
Greenock Morton F.C. players
Dumbarton F.C. wartime guest players
Association football midfielders
Date of birth missing